was a rear admiral in the Imperial Japanese Navy.

Biography
Nozaki was born in Aki District, Kōchi in what is now part of the village of Geisei, Kōchi. He graduated from the 21st class of the Imperial Japanese Naval Academy in 1894. He was commissioned as a lieutenant on September 29, 1899, and served as chief gunnery officer on the ironclad . From June to September 1900 he was deployed to China as a crewman on the cruiser , which was sent to support Japanese naval landing forces which occupied the port city of Tianjin in northern China during the Boxer Rebellion, as part of the Japanese contribution to the Eight-Nation Alliance. During the Russo-Japanese War, he served in various staff positions and was promoted to lieutenant commander on August 5, 1905. Nozaki graduated from the Naval War College in December 1907 and was promoted to commander in March 1910. He served as chief gunnery officer on the battleship  from July 1910 to December 1911.  

He received his first command, that of the cruiser  on October 30, 1914 and was promoted to captain in December of the same year. During World War I, Nozaki was chief-of-staff of the Interim Southern Islands Defense Unit from March 1915 to November 1916, and captained the cruiser  from December 1916 to December 1917. Afterwards, he was an inspector at the Yokosuka Naval Arsenal to April 1919, when he returned to sea as captain of the new battleship   to November 1919. He was promoted to rear admiral on December 1, 1919 and Commander of the Interim Southern Islands Defense Unit from December 1919 to April 1922. 

He went on the reserve list in March 1923 and retired November 1933.

Honors
1914 -  Order of the Sacred Treasure, 3rd class
1921 -  Order of the Sacred Treasure, 2nd class

References

External links
 

1872 births
1946 deaths
Imperial Japanese Naval Academy alumni
Imperial Japanese Navy admirals
People from Kōchi Prefecture
Japanese military personnel of the Boxer Rebellion
Japanese military personnel of the Russo-Japanese War
Japanese military personnel of World War I
Naval War College (Japan) alumni